Dmitry Popko was the defending champion but chose not to defend his title.

Marco Cecchinato won the title after defeating Luca Van Assche 6–3, 6–3 in the final.

Seeds

Draw

Finals

Top half

Bottom half

References

External links
Main draw
Qualifying draw

Lisboa Belém Open - 1
2022 Men's singles